The 2016–17 Stony Brook Seawolves women's basketball team will represent Stony Brook University during the 2016–17 NCAA Division I women's basketball season. The Seawolves, led by third year head coach Caroline McCombs, played their home games at the Island Federal Credit Union Arena and are members in the America East Conference. They finished the season 12–18, 5-11 in America East play to finish in eighth place. They lost in the quarterfinals of the America East women's tournament to New Hampshire.

Media
All non-televised home games and conference road games will stream on either ESPN3 or AmericaEast.tv. Most road games will stream on the opponents website. All games will have an audio broadcast streamed online through the Pack Network.

Roster

Schedule

|-
!colspan=9 style="background:#; color:white;"| Non-conference regular season

|-
!colspan=9 style="background:#; color:white;"| America East regular season

|-
!colspan=9 style="background:#; color:white;"| America East Women's Tournament

See also
 2016–17 Stony Brook Seawolves men's basketball team

References

Stony Brook Seawolves women's basketball seasons
Stony Brook Seawolves women's basketball team
Stony Brook Seawolves women's basketball team
Stony Brook Seawolves women's basketball team